Marta Żmuda Trzebiatowska (born 26 July 1984, in Człuchów) is a Polish film, television and theater actress.

She is best known for playing the role of Marta Orkisz in Polish TV series Teraz albo nigdy! and Monika Miller in Julia. She has also appeared in a number of notable television series, including Kryminalni (Crime Detectives), Na dobre i na złe (For better and for worse), Magda M., and Twarzą w twarz (Face to Face).

In 2008 she took part in the 8th season of the popular TV show Taniec z gwiazdami (Dancing with the Stars). Her dance partner was Adam Król. They took 3rd place.

Filmography

Film

Television

Video games

External links 

Official profile in Filmpolski.pl database

1984 births
Polish film actresses
Polish television actresses
People from Człuchów
Polish stage actresses
20th-century Polish actresses
21st-century Polish actresses
Polish voice actresses
Polish video game actresses
Living people
Aleksander Zelwerowicz National Academy of Dramatic Art in Warsaw alumni